Paraselinum is a genus of flowering plants belonging to the family Apiaceae.

Its native range is Peru to Bolivia.

Species:
 Paraselinum weberbaueri H.Wolff

References

Apiaceae
Apiaceae genera